Lake of the Woods is a census-designated place (CDP) in Champaign County, Illinois, United States. The population was 2403 at the 2020 census. Lake of the Woods is in Mahomet Township and mostly surrounded by the northeast part of the village of Mahomet.

Geography

Demographics

As of the 2020 census there were 2,403 people, 938 households, and 640 families residing in the CDP. The racial makeup of the CDP was 89.31% White, 0.54% African American, 0.29% Native American, 0.54% Asian, 1.79% from other races, and 7.53% from two or more races. Hispanic or Latino of any race were 3.75% of the population.

There were 938 households, out of which 91.15% had children under the age of 18 living with them, 47.76% were married couples living together, 10.55% had a female householder with no husband present, and 31.77% were non-families. 31.77% of all households were made up of individuals, and 13.75% had someone living alone who was 65 years of age or older. The average household size was 3.38 and the average family size was 2.68.

The CDP's age distribution consisted of 34.0% under the age of 18, 7.0% from 18 to 24, 27.2% from 25 to 44, 17.3% from 45 to 64, and 14.6% who were 65 years of age or older. The median age was 31.8 years. For every 100 females, there were 125.6 males. For every 100 females age 18 and over, there were 103.4 males.

The median income for a household in the CDP was $59,257, and the median income for a family was $90,556. Males had a median income of $44,133 versus $40,000 for females. The per capita income for the CDP was $26,662. About 9.1% of families and 7.3% of the population were below the poverty line, including 8.8% of those under age 18 and 5.2% of those age 65 or over.

References

External links
Lake of the Woods Forest Preserve, Mahomet, Illinois

Census-designated places in Illinois
Census-designated places in Champaign County, Illinois